HMS Minstrel (J445) was a reciprocating engine-powered  during the Second World War. She survived the war and was sold to Thailand in 1947 as HTMS Phosamton (MSF-1).

Design and description

The ships' complement consisted of 85 officers and ratings.

The reciprocating ships had two vertical triple-expansion steam engines, each driving one shaft, using steam provided by two Admiralty three-drum boilers.

The Algerine class was armed with a QF  Mk V anti-aircraft gun and four twin-gun mounts for Oerlikon 20 mm cannon. The latter guns were in short supply when the first ships were being completed and they often got a proportion of single mounts. By 1944, single-barrel Bofors 40 mm mounts began replacing the twin 20 mm mounts on a one for one basis. All of the ships were fitted for four throwers and two rails for depth charges.

Construction and career

Service in the Royal Navy 
The ship was ordered on 15 March 1943 at the Redfern Construction Company at Toronto, Canada. She was laid down on 27 June 1944 and launched on 5 October 1944. She was commissioned on 7 June 1945.

On 9 April 1947, a turning over ceremony from the Royal Navy to Royal Siamese Navy was held in the naval dockyard of Singapore. She was commissioned later that year on 20 November.

Service in the Royal Thai Navy 
On 4 April 1953, she was reclassified as a training ship for cadets. Along with the cadets, the ship traveled to Europe for Naval Cadets training and joined the Sea Review on the occasion of Queen Elizabeth II’s coronation day on 2 June.

In 1966, she underwent refit which replaced her main gun with a single Bofors 40 mm gun, two dual Bofors 40 mm Mark 24 guns and two DCT radars.

Her pennant number was later changed to MSC-415, somewhere after 1969.

In 1984, the ship again underwent refit which replaced her main gun with a 3"/50 caliber Mark 22 gun, one single Bofors 40 mm Mark 3 gun, two single Oerlikon 20 mm Mark 10 cannons and a Raytheon 1500B navigation radar.

Her pennant number was again changed to MSC-611, somewhere before 2002.

The ship was decommissioned in 2012 and since then, in October later that year, she was turned into a museum ship and now permanently moored at Nong Bua, Mueang Chanthaburi District, Chanthaburi.

On 13 May 2019, Royal Thai Navy had sent high ranking officials to inspect the ship for the ship's condition. It was noted that the ship has been in disrepair for a long time and they would be finding a solution to repair her.

References

Bibliography
 
 
 Peter Elliott (1977) Allied Escort Ships of World War II. MacDonald & Janes,

External links
 

 

Algerine-class minesweepers of the Royal Navy
Ships built in Ontario
1944 ships
World War II minesweepers of the United Kingdom
Ships of the Royal Thai Navy
Museum ships in Thailand